Aristides Baltas (born 9 February 1943) is a philosopher of science and physicist who served as the Minister of Culture and Sports of Greece and as the Minister of Culture, Education and Religious Affairs in the cabinet of Alexis Tsipras from 27 January 2015 to 4 November 2016.

He is currently the Emeritus Professor of Philosophy of Science at the National Technical University of Athens and President of the Nicos Poulantzas Institute. In the September 2015 Greek legislative election, he was elected MP for the Attica constituency with Syriza.

Education and academic career

Baltas trained in electrical and mechanical engineering at the National Technical University of Athens (NTUA) from 1962 to 1967 before going on to complete a doctorate in theoretical physics under  at University of Paris XI in 1971. His thesis title was La Neutrino-Production des Résonances Baryoniques dans le Modèle des Quarks ("Neutrino Production of Baryonic Resonances in the Quark Model"). In 1982, he returned to NTUA to become a lecturer at the Department of Physics. From 1984 to 1985 he was a visiting fellow at the Center for Philosophy of Science of the University of Pittsburgh, a capacity he later resumed in 2005–6. He was appointed assistant professor of philosophy and methodology of physics at NTUA in 1984, then associate professor of the philosophy of science in 1992 and professor in 2002.

Baltas's research has dealt particularly with the epistemology of Louis Althusser, and more generally with the relationship between philosophy of science and epistemology and between analytic and continental philosophy. His work encompasses the fields of physics, mathematics, psychoanalysis, and historical materialism. Other philosophers studied by Baltas include Ludwig Wittgenstein, Friedrich Nietzsche, Baruch Spinoza, Jacques Derrida, John McDowell, and Walter Benjamin.

Awards

In 2002, Baltas was awarded the National Prize for Nonfiction for his book Objects and Aspects of Self (Αντικείμενα και όψεις εαυτού). In December 2010, he received the Xanthopoulos–Pneumatikos Award for Excellence in Academic Teaching.

Political career

A founding member of the Coalition of the Radical Left (SYRIZA), in 2012 Baltas was a coordinating member of its policy planning committee. Following the victory of Syriza victory in the Greek legislative election of January 2015, Baltas was appointed as Minister of Culture, Education and Religious Affairs in the Tsipras Cabinet. Soon after entering office, Baltas stated that beyond the immediate objectives of relieving the humanitarian crisis in Greek schools and resolving the problem of "eternal students" who are forced to suspend their studies in order to find work to sustain themselves, his long-term goals as minister would be to restore the independence of secondary education from higher education, to abolish pan-Hellenic examinations, and to support free access to higher education.

Books in English

 Peeling Potatoes or Grinding Lenses: Spinoza and Young Wittgenstein Converse on Immanence and Its Logic. Pittsburgh: University of Pittsburgh Press, 2012

References

|-

1943 births
Politicians from Corfu
Living people
20th-century Greek philosophers
21st-century Greek philosophers
Philosophers of science
Government ministers of Greece
Syriza politicians
Culture ministers of Greece
Greek MPs 2015–2019
Academic staff of the National Technical University of Athens